Pangbourne is a village and civil parish on the River Thames in Berkshire, England.  Pangbourne has its own shops, schools, a railway station on the Great Western main line and a village hall. Outside its grouped developed area is an independent school, Pangbourne College.

Geography
It is across the river from the Oxfordshire village of Whitchurch-on-Thames. The two villages are connected by Whitchurch Bridge and by the traversable weir of Whitchurch Lock. The River Pang flows through the centre of Pangbourne village before joining the Thames between Whitchurch Lock and Whitchurch bridge. Most of the developed area is just above the current flood plain of the River Thames which benefits from hay meadows traditionally used as flood meadows to either side of Pangbourne. Fewer than 15 properties here flooded during the Winter storms of 2013–14 in the United Kingdom.

History

Pangbourne's name is recorded from 844 as Old English Pegingaburnan (dative case), which means "the stream of the people of [a man called] Pǣga". In Norman times, the manor was given to Reading Abbey and the manor house – also called Bere Court – became the abbot's summer residence. The last abbot, Hugh Cook Faringdon, was arrested there in 1539 and subsequently executed in Reading. The manor was later purchased by Sir John Davis, the Elizabethan mathematician and the Earl of Essex's fellow-conspirator. His monument is in the Church of England parish church of Saint James the Less. 

The Pangbourne war memorial is found in the grounds of the church. It was designed by the artist Vera Waddington. Other monuments and hatchments in the church are mostly to the Breedon family. John Breedon, Senior, bought the manor in 1671. He was High Sheriff of Berkshire and brother of the Governor of Nova Scotia, whose son later succeeded John at the manor. The family produced a number of sheriffs and MPs for Berkshire, as well as doctors and rectors of the parish.

Kenneth Grahame, author of The Wind in the Willows, retired to Church Cottage in Pangbourne.He died there in 1932. E. H. Shepherd's famous illustrations of his book are said to have been inspired by the Thameside landscape there and the water voles of the river are thought to have inspired the character of Ratty. The Falkland Islands memorial chapel at Pangbourne College was opened by Queen Elizabeth II in March 2000. It was built to commemorate the lives and sacrifice of all who died during the Falklands War of 1982, and the courage of those who served with them to preserve the sovereignty of the islands. The Queen revisited the Memorial Chapel in 2007 to mark the 25th anniversary of the Falklands war.

Governance
Pangbourne is a civil parish with an elected parish council. The parish covers the immediate agricultural green buffer and a part wooded, part cultivated south-western area. The rural area contains no other significant settlements and includes Pangbourne College. The parish shares boundaries with the Berkshire parishes of Purley-on-Thames, Tidmarsh, Sulham, Bradfield and Basildon. Along the River Thames, to the north, there is also a boundary with the Oxfordshire parish of Whitchurch-on-Thames. The parish is in the area of the unitary authority of West Berkshire. The parish council and the unitary authority are responsible for different aspects of local government. Pangbourne forms part of the Reading West parliamentary constituency. The parish is twinned with Houdan in France.

Transport
 railway station is a minor stop on the Great Western Main Line and has stopping services to  via , and to  via .

Pangbourne and District Silver Band

The history of the Pangbourne Band began in 1893 when a fife and drum band used to rehearse in a shed behind the water mill, but when the First World War broke out the band broke up, re-forming in 1919 after the Armistice.  Regular concerts were held from then until the outbreak of the Second World War, when many of the bandsmen served in the Armed Forces and the band again broke up and the instruments were held in storage. In 1962, Henry Fuller, a local tutor, started the village brass group.  Local musicians became involved when the old instruments were recovered from storage, and the band was established as a full-size contesting brass band within a few years.  In 2009, Pangbourne All-Comers' Band was begun, incorporating brass and, for parade days, drums and bell lyre glockenspiel.

Demography and land use

References

Bibliography

External links

Pangbourne village website
Royal Berkshire History: Pangbourne

Populated places on the River Thames
Villages in Berkshire
West Berkshire District
Civil parishes in Berkshire